Gary Grant (born April 21, 1965) is a retired American professional basketball player at the point guard position in the National Basketball Association (NBA). He also played four professional seasons in Greece.

College career
Gary "The General" Grant played for Canton McKinley High School and collegiately at the University of Michigan. Gary received his BA in Kinesiology.

Grant holds several Michigan records including career starts (128), career assists (731), career steals (total and per game), career minutes, career turnovers, single-season assists per game, single-season steals (total and per game, 1st, 2nd and 3rd places for both), single-season turnovers, and single-game steals.

During the 2010–11 NCAA Division I men's basketball season while playing for the 2010–11 Michigan Wolverines team,  Darius Morris surpassed Grant's school record single-season assist total set for the 1987–88 team. The following season Trey Burke broke Grant's freshman season assist total record. In the regular season finale for the 2016–17 team, Derrick Walton broke his single-game assists record.

Professional career
He was selected in the 1988 NBA Draft by the Seattle SuperSonics, but his rights were traded to the Los Angeles Clippers on draft night with a future first round pick for Michael Cage. On April 4, 1989, during a win over the Trail Blazers, Grant scored 17 points and recorded 20 assists, the latter of which was the highest single game total of any player in the NBA all season. The following season, Grant averaged career-highs of 13.1 points, 10 assists, 3.1 rebounds, and 2.5 steals per game each. Ultimately, he remained a Clipper for seven years before moving on to the New York Knicks, the Miami Heat, and the Portland Trail Blazers.

Personal life
Grant has three children with Tammie Grant: Taryn, Mahogany, and Piper.

He has a cameo appearance in the 1992 Dean Cameron film Miracle Beach.

References

External links
NBA.com Grant player profile

1965 births
Living people
20th-century African-American sportspeople
21st-century African-American people
African-American basketball players
All-American college men's basketball players
American expatriate basketball people in Greece
American men's basketball players
Aris B.C. players
Basketball players from Canton, Ohio
Los Angeles Clippers players
McDonald's High School All-Americans
Miami Heat players
Michigan Wolverines men's basketball players
New York Knicks players
Parade High School All-Americans (boys' basketball)
Point guards
Portland Trail Blazers players
Seattle SuperSonics draft picks
Yakima Sun Kings players